Kill Fee is a 1985 novel by American writer Barbara Paul.

Plot 
Leon Walsh is publisher for the magazine Summit, which he will soon take over since his boss Joe Sussman has been killed. Walsh had a perfect alibi at the time of the murder. Professional killer Pluto then sends Walsh a bill of $100,000 for the murder.

Adaptations 
The novel was adapted into a 1990 TV-film, Murder C.O.D..

1985 American novels
American crime novels